{{Infobox person
| name               = Kim Michele Richardson
| citizenship        = United States
| occupation         = Writer; Novelist
| notable_works      = The Book Woman of Troublesome Creek
| spouse             = Joe Richardson
| website            = https://www.kimmichelerichardson.com/|
}}
Kim Michele Richardson is an American writer.

As a child Richardson was placed in a rural Kentucky orphanage, Saint Thomas-Saint Vincent Orphan Asylum. In 2004, she and her sisters, along with 40 other plaintiffs who had lived in the institution run by the Sisters of Charity order and the Roman Catholic Church sued for damages suffered through alleged years of abuse by their caretakers between the 1930s to the 1970s. Richardson recounted her experiences at the orphanage during the 1960s and 1970s in her memoir The Unbreakable Child.

 Bibliography 
Fiction

 The Book Woman's Daughter (Sourcebooks Landmark, 2022); 
 The Book Woman of Troublesome Creek (Sourcebooks Landmark, 2019); 
 The Sisters of Glass Ferry (Kensington, 2017); 
 GodPretty in the Tobacco Field (Kensington, 2016); 
 Liar's Bench (Kensington, 2015): 

Memoir

 The Unbreakable Child'' (Kunati, 2009);

References

External links 
 

20th-century American women writers
American women novelists
20th-century American memoirists
American women non-fiction writers
Year of birth missing (living people)
Living people
21st-century American women